The 1989 All-Ireland Minor Hurling Championship was the 59th staging of the All-Ireland Minor Hurling Championship since its establishment by the Gaelic Athletic Association in 1982. The championship began on 19 April 1989 and ended on 3 September 1989.

Kilkenny entered the championship as the defending champions, however, they were beaten by Offaly in the Leinster final.

On 3 September 1989, Offaly won the championship following a 2–16 to 1–12 defeat of Clare in the All-Ireland final. This was their third All-Ireland title overall and their first title since 1987.

Offaly's Johnny Dooley was the championship's top scorer.

Results

Leinster Minor Hurling Championship

Quarter-finals

Semi-finals

Finals

Munster Minor Hurling Championship

First round

Semi-finals

Final

Ulster Minor Hurling Championship

Semi-final

Final

All-Ireland Minor Hurling Championship

Semi-finals

Final

References

External links
 All-Ireland Minor Hurling Championship: Roll Of Honour

Minor
All-Ireland Minor Hurling Championship